Under-18 world best performances in the sport of athletics are the best marks set in competition by athletes aged 17 or younger throughout the entire calendar year of the performance. World Athletics (formerly IAAF) maintains an official list for such performances, but only in a specific list of outdoor events.  All other records, including all indoor records, shown on this list are tracked by statisticians not officially sanctioned by the world governing body. These age category records were formerly called world youth bests.

Outdoor
Key:

h = hand timing

A = affected by altitude

OT = oversized track (> 200m in circumference)

X = annulled due to doping violation

Boys

Girls

Mixed

Indoor
World Athletics does not keep official "bests" in indoor events for the Youth division.

Boys

Girls

See also
IAAF World Youth Championships in Athletics
Youth (athletics)

Notes
1. Though sometimes called "world youth records", they are not officially recognized or ratified as such by any body. World Athletics refers to them as World Youth Bests (WYB) or World Youth Best Performances instead.

References
General
World Athletics U-18 Best Performances 9 September 2022 updated
Specific

Youths
World